PrivateFly is a global private jet charter broker company with websites covering 19 countries: (Australia, Canada, China, Czech Republic, France, Germany, Hungary, Italy, Netherlands, New Zealand, Poland, Qatar, Russia, Slovakia, Spain, Switzerland, UAE, UK, & US). The company's main headquarters are in St Albans, Hertfordshire, England. The company is a member of ACANA, BACA, EBAA and NBAA aviation industry bodies. In 2018 PrivateFly became part of Directional Aviation's OneSky portfolio of companies.

The company uses technology to disrupt the traditional jet charter brokering model launching a website with online estimates and quotes, and also offering apps for iPhone, iPad and Android devices.

It provides a white-label service and partners with several companies including Lastminute.com, Manchester Airport Group and Addison Lee.

History 

PrivateFly was launched in 2008 by ex-RAF and NetJets pilot, Adam Twidell and Carol Cork.

The company expanded and had several veteran figures from the travel industry on the board including Martin George and Damon de Laszlo.

It received awards including the Smarta's Top 100 small businesses for 2010, Best Business Award "Best Innovation", Flight Global's Site of the Year Webbies award and Everline Future 50.

PrivateFly was listed 4th in The Sunday Times Fast Track SME Export Track 100 (Britain's SMEs with the fastest-growing international sales)  and 46th in The Sunday Times Fast Track Tech Track 100 (Britain's fastest-growing private technology companies).

In 2011, it raised a £2 million investment through several investors to help further develop their European expansion.

In 2016, the company opened an office in Fort Lauderdale, Florida  It became the first UK Argus Certified Broker in 2016.

PrivateFly runs an annual poll to find the Top 10 Airport Approaches. Previous winners include Sion Airport, Barra Airport, Sint Maarten Airport, Queenstown Airport, Nice Airport and Malta Airport.

In September 2018 PrivateFly was acquired by the Directional Aviation OneSky group. 

In April 2019, PrivateFly announced fixed-rate pricing on several routes in Europe on six-seat Nextant 400XTi light jets and Legacy 600 heavy jets. Routes are mainly to and from London, Paris, Nice, Rome, Milan, Geneva, Palma, and Ibiza. 

In August 2020, PrivateFly launched a new Private Jet Card offering guaranteed aircraft availability and fixed hourly private jet prices for flights in the Europe and USA.

References

Companies based in the City and District of St Albans
Charter airlines of Canada